A bow tie is a fashion accessory, popularly worn with other formal attire

Bow tie, Bowtie, or Bow-tie may also refer to:

Places
Bow Tie Nebula, another name for the Boomerang Nebula in the constellation Centaurus
Bow-Tie Nebula, another name for NGC 40 (C2) in the constellation Cepheus

People
Donald Tsang, nicknamed "Bow-tie Tsang", the second Chief Executive in Hong Kong SAR, China

Arts, entertainment, and media
Bow Tie (My Little Pony), one of the fictional My Little Pony Earth ponies 
Bow Tie killer, a character in the Problem Child (1990 film)
Bow ties are cool, a reference to The Eleventh Doctor in the Doctor Who series
"Bowtie", a song by OutKast from their 2003 album Speakerboxxx/The Love Below

Brands and enterprises
Bow Tie Cinemas
Bow-tie, a brand name of polarization-maintaining optical fiber
BowTie Inc., a magazine and book publisher

Mathematics
Bow tie angle, an angle in geometry
Bowtie stub, a radial stub
Bowtie-quadrilateral, a geometric structure
⋈, the symbol used for the natural join operator of relational algebra

Science and technology
Bow tie (biology), a common organizational architecture in biological and other self-organizing systems
Bowtie (sequence analysis), ultrafast, memory-efficient short aligner for short DNA sequences
Bowtie, a type of architecture in load balancing (computing)
Bowtie array, a reflective array antenna
Bowtie cotter pin,  a formed wire fastener that resembles an R-clip, except it positively locks when installed
Bowtie turtle, a Philippine forest turtle

Other uses
Bowtie (road), a type of road junction
Bow-tie diagrams, used in risk management and  network theory
Bowtie inversion, one of many types of roller coaster inversions
Bowtie pasta, another name for farfalle